Ductal carcinoma is a type of tumor that primarily presents in the ducts of a gland.

Types include:
 Mammary
Ductal carcinoma in situ
Invasive ductal carcinoma
 Pancreatic ductal carcinoma

References

External links 

Carcinoma